James Biggs may refer to:

 James Crawford Biggs (1872–1960), American lawyer and politician,
 James Hesketh Biggs, painter, photographer and engraver in South Australia